Bhairava Dweepam is a 1994 Indian Telugu-language high fantasy film directed by Singeetam Srinivasa Rao who co-wrote the film with Raavi Kondala Rao. It is produced by B. Venkatarama Reddy under the Chandamama Vijaya Pictures banner. The film stars Nandamuri Balakrishna and Roja, with music composed by Madhavapeddi Suresh. The film was a box office success and won nine state Nandi Awards. Bhairava Dweepam is considered as a landmark fantasy film in Telugu cinema.

Plot 
The film begins in Chandraprabha Dynasty, King Jayachandra deserts a woman, Vasundhara after giving birth to a baby boy. But in the wake of this, he perturbs and proceeds for her. On a cyclonic night, Vasudhara loses her child who has been guarded by a tribal chieftain, and rears him as Vijay. Shattered Vasundhara attempts suicide when a hermit Jamadagni consoles and shelters her. He also designs a flower that indicates her son's existence and tells her that he will be safe until it flourishes. Years roll by, and Vijay grows as gallant & courteous. 

Once his fosters aspire to possess a divine liquid from a tree of water which provides youngness. So, Vijay moves with his sibling Kondanna. Wherefore, he crushes on Princess Padmavati the daughter of King Brahmananda Bhupathi, and she too reciprocates. One night, Vijay climbs up the cattle from the back door, breezily spends with Padma, and simply returns defeating the soldiers. Besides, Jayachandra loses his vision when his imbecilic sons Uttar & Dakshin occupy the crown and ostracizes him in a desert. Brahmananda invites the two princes to Swayamvaram for espousing Padma as per the word given to Jayachandra. Vijay is cognizant of it and arrives as the prince in disguise accompanying Kondanna. Simultaneously the originals also appear and the situation is perplexing. Anyhow, Brahmananda guests two. After a while, Vijay’s true identity comes out and he skips when Padma unequivocally says that she will splice him. 

Now the page turns to a mysterious island Bhairava Dweepam where a diabolic wizard Bhairava fervid at winning immortality. To reach it, he has to sacrifice a virgin's blood to Goddess Kaali. On a full moon day, Bhairava abducts Padma from the castle in a trance. Like this, she pledges before the goddess to anoint with her blood on full moon day and departs. The next morning, frightened Padma slightly recoups a few incidents of the past night and falls sick when doctors declare it as Black Magic. In this respect, Brahmananda accuses Vijay who seizes and tortures him. Then, Vijay is aware that Padma is ailing. Immediately, he rushes to her, learns about the impending catastrophe, and flees. Just as he falls to the ground near Jamadagni Ashram where Vasundhara showers motherly affection and retrieves him. She also blesses him with a bracelet with keeps him far away from evil forces. On the full moon day, Vijay secretly enters the castle and spots a green fog carrying Padma along with her bed by putting all unconscious. Nevertheless, it excludes Vijay via the impact of the bracelet and switches to Island hanging on to bed. 

Consequently, he relives the curse of a nymph who bestows him a ring as gratitude which can reverse Bhairava magic on the bed. As well as, she warns him it's not the proper time to clash with the wizard. Hence, Vijay brings back Padma from the trance and implicitly flights on the bed with the power of the ring. Soon, Bhairava assaults a dragon while Vijay is separated from the bed when he falls into the sea destroying it and keeping Padma at a safe pace. A naughty devil pair views him at the shore bordering the desert which makes him conscious and narrates their past. They used to be in the court of Bhairava who gripped them in a bottle and threw this in place. Further, they got out by the kick of a blind Jayachandra. As a thanksgiving, Jayachandra asks for food from them. But unfortunately, he seats in Lord Tumbura'''s temple when his devotee a white flying horse enrages prevents him from eating as a penalty that repeats daily. Currently, the devil request Vijay to fulfill their indebtedness. Vijay with his art of music convinces and also wishes the horse to provide vision to Jayachandra which it does so. Moreover, it gives a boon to Vijay that it is going to aid him to transport to any mysterious places.

Following, the devil divulges Vijay regarding a Satha-Ratna necklace a tool to protect Padma found in Yakshini Lokam. Accordingly, he takes the path by requesting Jayachandra to reside at their hamlet. On the flip side, terror-stricken Brahmananda announces accord half the dynasty along with his daughter’s hand whoever rescues Padma. Meanwhile, with the support of 4 Lilliputians, Vijay lands at his destination falsely entices a Yakshiki and wins the necklace after adventurous feats. At that point, infuriated Yakshini curses Vijay who turns into a ghastly. Plus, she states that the necklace shall be repealed if it falls on the ground or he discloses himself. Parallelly, the flower at Jamadagni Ashram shifts black which agonizes Vasundhara. Thereupon, Jamadagni says that her son is safe but he is in some endanger. 

On a full moon night, Vijay as incognito succeeds Padma in wearing the necklace. As of today, it's inevitable for Brahmananda to organize nuptials of the grim Vijay & Padma. During Bhairava sends his acolyte as a priest who proclaims that hideous has heisted the necklace from Vijay. Listening to it, Padma throws it away, and the wizard snatches her. Promptly, Vijay aims to reach the island before the full moon night. Ahead of that, he goes to Jamadagni Ashram for the grace of Vasundhara when she discovers him as his son by comparing him with a faded flower. Abiding by the guidelines of Jamadagni Vijay invokes the magic horse to meet the target. However, it is unfeasible to transport him because of his curse but is there a possibility that someone transfers his curse granting their form? Thus, Vasundhara takes it up and directs normal Vijay to come back victoriously. On account of it, Vijay steps into Bhairava Dweepam by riding over the magic horse. At last, Vijay ceases Bhairava when the island collapses and Goddess appear who removes the cure of his mother. Finally, the movie ends on a happy note with the marriage of Vijay & Padma and the union of the Chandraprabha and the Karthikeya dynasties.

 Cast 

Nandamuri Balakrishna as Vijay
Roja as Padmavathi
Satyanarayana as Brahmananda Bhupati
Vijayakumar as Jayachandra Maharaju
Vijaya Rangaraju as Bhairavudu
Subhalekha Sudhakar as Dakshin
Giri Babu as Uttar
Babu Mohan
Mikkilineni as Jamadagni Maharshi
Padmanabham as Mattepa Sastry
Malladi
Suthi Velu as Devil
Kovai Sarala as Allari deyyam
Vinod as Shoora Varma
Bheemiswara Rao
Chitti Babu as Lilliputian
Garimalla Visweswara Rao as Lilliputian
K. R. Vijaya as Vasundhara
Manorama
Sangeeta as Padma's mother
Radhabai
Rajitha as Madanika
Kovai Sarala as Devil
Attili Lakshmi
Sailaja
Rambha as Yakshini (Cameo appearance)

 Production 
Raavi Kondala Rao wrote the story of Bhariava Dweepam on the lines of Pathala Bhairavi (1951). Singeetam Srinivasa Rao took up the direction duties and Nandamuri Balakrishna immediately accepted the film as it closely resembled Pathala Bhairavi in which his father N. T. Rama Rao played the lead role. The antagonist Bhariavudu was inspired from Nepala Matrikudu from Pathala Bhairavi. Several actors including Nana Patekar and Amrish Puri were considered for the role. However, the producer was convinced actor Malayalam actor Rajkumar was right for the role after watching him in Vietnam Colony (1992). He was given screen name Vijaya Rangaraju (to resemble S. V. Ranga Rao who played Nepali Matrikudu) for his debut in Telugu cinema.

Principal photography of the film began on 23 June 1993 at the Vijaya Vauhini Studios in Madras. Balakrishna plays a prince who later becomes a hunchback in the film.

 Soundtrack 

Music was composed by Madhavapeddi Suresh. Music released on Supreme Music Company.

 Reception 
K. Vijiyan of New Straits Times while reviewing the Tamil dubbed version Vijaya Prathapan praised Balakrishna's performance, special effects, and production design calling it an "enjoyable 'raja-rani' film".

 Legacy 
Hemanth Kumar CR writing for Vogue India in February 2020 noted, "[Bhairava Dweepam] is a quintessential fantasy film that pays homage to several mythical elements in popular Telugu folklore." Further, he listed it among the seven Telugu films to watch for fans of fantasy genre. Karthik Keramulu of Film Companion in July 2021 opined that it is one of the better made fantasy films in Telugu cinema and wrote, "The highlights of Bhairava Dweepam are a flying bed and a swashbuckling hero."

Actor and producer Nandamuri Kalyan Ram cited Bhairava Dweepam as one of his favourite films and an inspiration for producing the film Bimbisara'' (2022).

Awards 
Nandi Awards
 Third Best Feature Film – Bronze – B. Venkatarami Reddy
 Best Director – Singeetam Srinivas Rao
 Best Male Playback Singer – S. P. Balasubrahmanyam  for the song "Sri Thumabara Narada"
 Best Female Playback Singer – S. Janaki for the song "Naruda O Naruda Yemi Korikaa"
 Best Makeup Artist – M. Sathyam
 Best Costume Designer – Kondala Reddy
 Best Audiographer – Kolli Ramakrishna
 Best Art Director – Peketi Ranga
 Special Jury Award – Kabir Lal for Best Photography

References

External links 
 

1990s fantasy action films
1990s fantasy adventure films
1990s Telugu-language films
1994 films
Fictional-language films
Filmfare Awards South winners
Films about witchcraft
Films directed by Singeetam Srinivasa Rao
Films scored by Madhavapeddi Suresh
High fantasy films
Indian fantasy action films
Indian fantasy adventure films
Nandi Award winners